William Gregory Lee (born January 24, 1973) is an American actor.

Career
His first prominent role was as Virgil on Xena: Warrior Princess. He also played the character of Zack on the series Dark Angel (2000–2001).

Lee has appeared in a number of other roles, including the 2002 horror film Wolves of Wall Street and his role as Ambrosius Vallin in the here! original series Dante's Cove.

He has also appeared as Sven in the 2005 film Beauty and the Beast.

Filmography

Film

Television

References

External links 
 

1973 births
American male actors
Living people
People from Virginia Beach, Virginia